In mathematics, an extreme point of a convex set  in a real or complex vector space is a point in  which does not lie in any open line segment joining two points of  In linear programming problems, an extreme point is also called vertex or corner point of

Definition

Throughout, it is assumed that  is a real or complex vector space. 

For any  say that    and  if  and there exists a  such that 

Generalizations

If  is a subset of a vector space then a linear sub-variety (that is, an affine subspace)  of the vector space is called a  if  meets  (that is,  is not empty) and every open segment  whose interior meets  is necessarily a subset of  A 0-dimensional support variety is called an extreme point of

Characterizations

The  is the midpoint of its endpoints. 

The closed interval  is equal to the convex hull of  if (and only if)  So if  is convex and  then  

Examples

Any open interval in  has no extreme points while any non-degenerate closed interval not equal to  does have extreme points (that is, the closed interval's endpoint(s)).  More generally, any open subset of finite-dimensional Euclidean space  has no extreme points.

The perimeter of any convex polygon in the plane is a face of that polygon. 
The vertices of any convex polygon in the plane  are the extreme points of that polygon. 

An injective linear map  sends the extreme points of a convex set  to the extreme points of the convex set  This is also true for injective affine maps.

Properties

The extreme points of a compact convex set form a Baire space (with the subspace topology) but this set may  to be closed in

Theorems

Krein–Milman theorem

The Krein–Milman theorem is arguably one of the most well-known theorems about extreme points.

For Banach spaces

These theorems are for Banach spaces with the Radon–Nikodym property. 

A theorem of Joram Lindenstrauss states that, in a Banach space with the Radon–Nikodym property, a nonempty closed and bounded set has an extreme point. (In infinite-dimensional spaces, the property of compactness is stronger than the joint properties of being closed and being bounded.)

Edgar’s theorem implies Lindenstrauss’s theorem.

Related notions

A closed convex subset of a topological vector space is called  if every one of its (topological) boundary points is an extreme point. The unit ball of any Hilbert space is a strictly convex set.

k-extreme points

More generally, a point in a convex set  is -extreme if it lies in the interior of a -dimensional convex set within  but not a -dimensional convex set within   Thus, an extreme point is also a -extreme point.  If  is a polytope, then the -extreme points are exactly the interior points of the -dimensional faces of   More generally, for any convex set  the -extreme points are partitioned into -dimensional open faces.

The finite-dimensional Krein-Milman theorem, which is due to Minkowski, can be quickly proved using the concept of -extreme points. If  is closed, bounded, and -dimensional, and if  is a point in  then  is -extreme for some   The theorem asserts that  is a convex combination of extreme points. If  then it is immediate.

See also

Citations

Bibliography

  
  
 
 
  
  
  
  
  
  
  
  
  
  
  
  

Convex geometry
Convex hulls
Functional analysis
Mathematical analysis